Sisurcana vilcanotae is a species of moth of the family Tortricidae. It is found in Peru.

The wingspan is about 31 mm. The ground colour of the forewings is brown ferruginous with some paler, yellower areas in the costal half of the wing postmedially. There are silver-grey suffusions in the basal area, along the costa and the posterior parts of the wing. The markings are dark rust brown. The hindwings are dirty cream, mixed with grey in the distal half.

Etymology
The species name refers to the Cordillera Vilcanota, the type locality.

References

Moths described in 2010
Sisurcana
Moths of South America
Taxa named by Józef Razowski